The Little Angels Public School is located at Jaggayyapeta, Andhra Pradesh, India.

It was established in 1980 as a school for the members of the Indian aristocracy. It is situated on a  campus. Children are schooled from pre-primary school through the 10th standard (age 3 to age 16). The school is recognized by the state government. Its administrative body is a non-profit organisation. The school motto is "Be Vigilant".

The House system
The student body is divided into four houses named after Indian mountain ranges:
 Himalaya
 Vindhya
 Aravalli
 Satpura

Uniform
 Blazers (dark navy blue) and ties (dark blue with a white strips insignia in the middle).
 Boys wear white shirts with navy blue shoulder-tabs with a stripe of their house colour across the tabs, and white shorts. Footwear consists of blue socks and black shoes.
 Girls wear white blouses under blue pinafores with belts and blue socks in black school shoes.
 Prefects are given stars, stripes or badges (gold eagles).

External links
 Map route

Schools in Krishna district
1980 establishments in Andhra Pradesh
Educational institutions established in 2020